This article presents a list of Indonesian provinces sorted by their gross regional product nominal (GRP Nominal and PPP).

Methodology 
GRP Nominal is the regional or provincial counterpart of the national gross domestic product, the most comprehensive measure of national economic activity. The Statistics Indonesia (Badan Pusat Statistik) derives GRP for a province as the sum of the GRP Nominal originating in all the industries in the province at current prices market.

List of Indonesian administrative divisions by GRP Nominal, with 14,308 IDR = US$1 term of Nominal while 4,833.87 IDR = US$1 term of PPP. Note some provinces have little population and large oil, gas, or mining revenues, and therefore GRP Nominal does not reflect consumer demand.

List

2022 data

List of province by past GDP (nominal)

BPS estimates between 2010 and 2018

BPS estimates between 2019 and 2022

See also
 Economy of Indonesia
 List of Indonesian provinces by GRP per capita
 List of Indonesian provinces by Human Development Index
 List of Indonesian cities by GDP
 List of ASEAN country subdivisions by GDP

References

GDP per capita
Provinces of Indonesia by GRP per capita
GRP
Indonesia